Pieter Antonsz Barbiers (bapt. April 23, 1717 in Amsterdam – September 7, 1780 in Amsterdam) was a skillful Dutch artist. He painted scenery for the theaters in Amsterdam, Leiden, etc.  Another picture representing the conflagration of the former in the year 1772 has been engraved by C. Bagerts.

His sons Bartholomeus Barbiers and Pieter Pietersz Barbiers were also painters.

References

1717 births
1780 deaths
18th-century Dutch painters
18th-century Dutch male artists
Dutch male painters
Painters from Amsterdam